Sassy Soul Strut is an album by jazz saxophonist Lou Donaldson recorded for the Blue Note label featuring Donaldson with Thad Jones, Garnett Brown, Seldon Powell, Buddy Lucas, Paul Griffin, Horace Ott, Hugh McCracken, David Spinozza, John Tropea, Wilbur Bascomb, Bernard Purdie, Omar Clay, and Jack Jennings, with arrangements by George Butler.

The album was awarded 2½ stars in an AllMusic review by Jason Ankeny who stated "Sassy Soul Strut quickly settles comfortably into a light, accessible mode too lively to dismiss as smooth jazz but too mellow to pass as anything else. Butler's arrangements haven't dated particularly well, but the record's too innocuous and good-natured to qualify as an outright failure. It's simply forgettable, nothing more and nothing less".

Track listing
All compositions by Lou Donaldson except as indicated
 "Sanford and Son Theme (The Streetbeater)" (Quincy Jones) - 7:00
 "Pillow Talk" (Michael Burton, Sylvia Robinson) - 4:52
 "Sassy Soul Strut" - 5:00
 "Good Morning Heartache" (Ervin Drake, Dan Fisher, Irene Higginbotham) - 2:32
 "City, Country, City" - 9:10
 "This Is Happiness" (Tadd Dameron) - 5:19
 "Inner Space" - 6:58
Recorded at Generation Sound Studios, NYC on April 17, 1973 (tracks 1, 6 & 7) and April 18, 1973 (tracks 2-5).

Personnel
Lou Donaldson - varitone alto saxophone
Thad Jones - trumpet
Garnett Brown - trombone
Seldon Powell - tenor saxophone, flute
Buddy Lucas - harmonica
Paul Griffin - piano, electric piano, organ
Horace Ott - electric piano
Hugh McCracken, David Spinozza, John Tropea - electric guitar
Wilbur Bascomb - electric bass
Bernard Purdie - drums
Omar Clay, Jack Jennings - percussion
George Butler - arranger

References

Lou Donaldson albums
1973 albums
Blue Note Records albums
Albums produced by George Butler (record producer)